The Minister of Housing and Urban Affairs is the head of the Ministry of Housing and Urban Poverty Alleviation and one of the cabinet ministers of the Government of India. Shri Hardeep Singh Puri is appointed as present Minister of State (Independent Charge) for Housing and Urban Poverty Alleviation, earlier held by Narendra Singh Tomar, M. Venkaiah Naidu & Girija Vyas.

References

Lists of government ministers of India
U